Distant Thunder is a 1988 American drama film directed by Rick Rosenthal and starring John Lithgow and Ralph Macchio.

Plot
The film tells the story of a troubled ex-Navy SEAL and Vietnam War veteran Mark Lambert (John Lithgow), who, upon returning home from the war, alienates his wife and child by deserting them and moving away into the remote wilderness of Washington state.

After 10 years of living off the land and suffering from posttraumatic stress disorder, Mark decides to rejoin civilized society and finds his now teenage son Jack (Ralph Macchio), who is living in Illinois. As an estranged father and recluse, Mark quickly finds himself unprepared for the changes that he must face.

Cast
 John Lithgow as Mark Lambert
 Ralph Macchio as Jack Lambert
 Kerrie Keane as Char
 Reb Brown as Harvey Nitz
 Janet Margolin as Barbara Lambert
 Denis Arndt as Larry
 Jamey Sheridan as Moss
 Tom Bower as Louis
 John Kelly as Andy
 Michael Currie as Coach Swabey
 Hilary Strang as Jane
 Robyn Stevan as Holly
 David Longworth as Sheriff
 Gordon Currie as Billy Watson
 Walter Marsh as The Principal
 Allan Lysell as Buddy
 Kate Robbins as The Waitress
 David Glyn-Jones as The Waiter
 Denalda Williams as Jeanette

Reception
The film received mixed reviews from movie critics. Roger Ebert commenting on this film said "Lithgow's performance is at the heart of the movie, and at the heart of his work is the way he smokes a cigarette or avoids looking anyone in the eye."

Box office
The movie was a box-office flop with a total revenue of barely $150,000 for a $8 million budget.

References

External links 

1988 films
Films set in Washington (state)
American drama films
1988 drama films
Vietnam War films
Films about United States Navy SEALs
Paramount Pictures films
Films directed by Rick Rosenthal
Films scored by Maurice Jarre
Films about father–son relationships
1980s English-language films
1980s American films
English-language drama films